Hyposmocoma unicolor is a species of moth of the family Cosmopterigidae. It was first described by Lord Walsingham in 1907. It is endemic to the Hawaiian island of Molokai and possibly Kauai and Oahu.

Larvae of what were considered to be this species were discovered in the dead wood of Acacia koa, Alectryon, Bidens, Cheirodendron, Clermontia, Elaeocarpus bifidus, Freycinetia, Diospyros and Wikstroemia. All of the host plant records are from Otto Herman Swezey, and may include details of more than one species.

External links

unicolor
Endemic moths of Hawaii
Moths described in 1907
Taxa named by Thomas de Grey, 6th Baron Walsingham